Mary Sackville, Countess of Dorset (née Curzon) (c.1586 – 1645) was an English royal governess.

Life 
Mary was born in Trentham and baptised in December 1586. She was the daughter and heiress of Sir George Curzon of Croxhall, Derbyshire. Her father created a  contract with the grandfather of Edward Sackville, 4th Earl of Dorset that they should be married.

Croxall Hall passed to the Sackville family, The Earls, and later, Dukes of Dorset, following the death of Sir George Curzon who was the last male of his line in 1622. Mary as his heir brought the property through her marriage to Edward Sackville, 4th Earl of Dorset in 1612. 

In 1628 her husband was made lord chamberlain of Queen Henrietta Maria and in 1630 she was appointed to the governess of Charles, prince of Wales, and James, duke of York, for a term of twelve years. She succeeded Jane Ker, countess of Roxburghe who was removed because she was a Catholic. On 20 July 1643 she received charge of the younger children, Henry, duke of Gloucester, and his sister Elizabeth, and was allowed £600 a year, with Knole House and Dorset House, in recognition of her services.

Death, funeral and legacy 
In 1645 she died, just as she was about to be relieved of her duties, and, as a reward for her ‘godly and conscientious care and pains,’ received a public funeral in Westminster Abbey.

Private life 
Her daughter, Mary, died young, 30 Oct. 1632. Her son Richard became the fifth earl. Another son Edward, was wounded at Newbury on, 20 Sept. 1643. He married Bridget, baroness Norreys, daughter of Edward Wray, and soon after he was taken prisoner by parliamentary soldiers at Kidlington, and killed at Chawley in the parish of Cumnor, near Oxford on 11 April 1646.

References 

1580s births
1645 deaths
Governesses to the English Royal Household
People from Staffordshire
English countesses
Mary